Richard and the Young Lions were an American garage rock band from Newark, New Jersey. They produced a moderately successful single with their song "Open Up Your Door".

History
The Young Lions originally performed under the name The Emeralds. When Richard Tepp saw the group perform, he was so impressed with the act, he joined the band, which resulted in changing their moniker to the Original Kounts. In addition to having a repertoire conceived of British Invasion cover versions, the band members became known as one of the more rebellious acts as a result of the band members growing their hair long. After being discovered by Larry Brown, (a.k.a. L. Russell Brown), and Ray Bloodworth during a chance encounter in a Newark pizzeria and joining Bob Crewe Productions, the name was changed to Richard and the Young Lions. The core of the group consisted of Tepp (lead vocals and tambourine), Bob Freedman (rhythm guitar and vocals), Marc Lees (lead guitar and vocals), Norm Cohen (drums), Ricky Rackin (guitar and bass guitar), and Jerry Raff (piano).

The Young Lions managed to produce one minor hit with their song "Open Up Your Door". The composition was the first ever recorded using an African hair drum. It reached number one in Cleveland, Ohio; Detroit, Michigan; Elyria, Ohio; and Salt Lake City, Utah; number two in Seattle, Washington and Vancouver, British Columbia, Canada; number three in Tucson, Arizona; and the Top 10 in many other cities in the US and Canada. Nationally, it peaked at number 99 on the Billboard Hot 100 chart on September 24, 1966, and number 91 on the Record World Top 100 Pops chart on October 8, 1966. The corresponding Cash Box listing was at number 70 on October 22, 1966. The band made several television appearances including The Hy Lit Show and The Jerry Blavat Show out of Philadelphia, PA. They also appeared in the Detroit market on Robin Seymour's Swingin' Time show, out of Windsor, Ontario. A video of that appearance on Swingin' Time has survived to this day and can be found on line.  And the band also made two appearances on the Upbeat TV show out of Cleveland, OH, hosted by Don Webster.

Their follow-up release, "Nasty", was chosen and released in late December 1966 and became a regional hit, but did not match the sales of their debut single. The Young Lions' final single, "You Can Make It" was released in February 1967 and received extensive radio play. However, the record company refused to distribute the single to the public, so "You Can Make It" failed to chart. The band sought to compose their own tracks, however they were no longer backed financially which led to their disbandment.

Original lead singer Richard Tepp died of leukemia on June 17, 2004.

Film
A documentary on the band was produced in 2004, entitled Out of Our Dens: The Richard and the Young Lions Story by James Hannon and Leon Leybs, and narrated by preeminent radio personality Pat St. John. It featured the group's history from their early days to their reunion shows in the early 2000s.

Discography

Albums
 Richard and the Young Lions – Volume 1 - 2 original songs and 9 remakes, with "Open Up Your Door" being one of the remakes without the original lead singer.
 Richard and the Young Lions – Volume 2 - 2 original songs ('Open Up Your Door" is one of those), and 8 remakes.

Singles
 "Open Up Your Door" b/w "Once Upon Your Smile": Philips 40381 (number 99 on the Billboard Hot 100) (1966) (both US and Canadian pressings)
 "Nasty" b/w "Lost and Found": Philips 40414 (1966) (both US and Canadian pressings)
 "You Can Make It" b/w "To Have and to Hold": Philips 40438 (1967) (both US and Canadian pressings)

Compilation appearances
 "You Can Make It", their swan song, was compiled on Volume 12 of the Pebbles series in 1983.
 "Open Up Your Door" was featured on the 1998 four CD box set, Nuggets: Original Artyfacts from the First Psychedelic Era, 1965–1968.

References

External links
 [ Richard and the Young Lions] at Allmusic
 RichardAndTheYoungLions.com
 Lantern-Media.com

Garage rock groups from New Jersey
Philips Records artists
Musical groups established in 1965